The University of Dayton Research Institute is the professional research arm of the University of Dayton in Dayton, Ohio. In fiscal year 2018, UD was ranked first among all colleges in the nation for federally sponsored materials research, according to statistics released by the National Science Foundation. In Ohio, UD is ranked first among nonprofit institutions for research sponsored by the Department of Defense.

Facts and information
The University of Dayton Research Institute (UDRI) employs 570 full-time research, technical and administrative staff. In 2018, UDRI performed $150 million in sponsored research. UDRI is nationally recognized for its research in materials, structures, sensors and autonomous systems, energy and sustainment technologies. Established as the research arm of the University of Dayton in 1956, UDRI broke the $2 billion mark in sponsored research in 2016.

References

External links
 University of Dayton Research Institute

Research institutes in Ohio
Nanotechnology institutions
Energy research institutes
Materials science institutes
Companies based in Dayton, Ohio
University of Dayton
Economy of Dayton, Ohio
Research institutes established in 1956
1956 establishments in Ohio